is a series of spin-off works by various authors based on the Hokuto no Ken (Fist of the North Star) manga by Buronson and Tetsuo Hara. They were all published in Weekly Comic Bunch between 2006 and 2010, with the exception of Jibo no Hoshi, which was published in Big Comic Superior. Each spin-off is set at some point during the Hokuto no Ken continuity and features a supporting character from the original manga as a protagonist.

After Comic Bunch ceased publication in 2010, Coamix would focus on more satirical spin-offs such as DD Hokuto no Ken (published on Monthly Comic Zenon) and Hokuto no Ken: Ichigo Aji (published online in Web Comic Zenyon). However, an additional side-story serial, titled Kin'yoku no Garuda was published in Comic Zenon in 2013, while additional side-stories would appear in the form of back-up stories for Ichigo Aji.

Titles

Ten no Haō

 by Youkow Osada was serialized in Weekly Comic Bunch from issues #231 (March 24, 2006) through #300 (August 24-31, 2007). It was adapted into a 13-episode anime series, which aired on Tokyo MX from October to December 2008. The series was released by Sentai Filmworks on Region 1 DVD in 2009, with an English dub released in 2010.

The manga focuses on Raoh, the eldest of the four Hokuto Brothers, as he seeks to use his strength to restore order in the post-apocalyptic world alongside his childhood friends Reina and Souga.

Jibo no Hoshi
 by Akimi Asai, was published in Big Comic Superior by Shogakukan. It was initially serialized as a limited series that ran from three issues, from March 10 to April 14, 2006. A second limited series was published in the following year, which lasted six issues from March 9 to June 8, 2007. Both runs were collected in a single tankōbon released on September 4, 2007.

The title centers around Yuria's youth prior to the nuclear holocaust and how she discovers her precognition ability (which was first established in the 2006 OVA Yuria Den).

Sōkoku no Garō
 by Yasuyuki Nekoi was serialized in the Weekly Comic Bunch from issues #286 (May 11–18, 2007) to 393 (July 31, 2009), lasting six collected editions.

The title centers around Rei, master of the elegant assassination art of Nanto Suichōken. He returns to his home village after the Nuclear War, only to find his parents mortally wounded and his sister Aili missing. With his dying breath, Rei's father tells him that a man with seven scars on his chest was the one who attacked them and kidnapped Aili. Now Rei wanders the wasteland as he encounters numerous bandits and warlords, including acquaintances from his training days at the Nanto Seiken school, in his quest to find and rescue Aili。

The first one shot was featured in the Hokuto no Ken tribute issue of Comic Bunch published on April 5, 2006. The second one-shot was in the Sōten no Ken tribute issue published on January 8, 2007. Neither one-shots were republished in the collected volumes.

Shirogane no Seija
, by Yuka Nagate, was published in Weekly Comic Bunch from issues #301 (September 7, 2007) to 363 (December 12, 2008).

The manga centers around Toki, the second of four honorary brothers trained in the art of Hokuto Shinken, was said to possess the most graceful skills out of the four brothers. However, he was forced to surrender his pursuit of the succession after being bathed in a radioactive fallout during the Nuclear War, and began wandering the wasteland with no aim, accompanied by his servant Ramo.

During his journey, Toki stumbles into a village where all its residents are on the verge on death due to an illness. Toki decides to heal everyone in the village and on the very next day, everyone is miraculously healed. The villagers welcomed Toki with open arms for restoring his hope and Toki sees this as an opportunity to accomplish his lifelong dream of becoming a doctor by opening his own clinic in the village. The place becomes known as the "Village of Miracles" and begins to attract the unwanted attention of various bandits and ravagers.

Gokuaku no Hana
 by Sin-ichi Hiromoto was published in the Weekly Comic Bunch from issues #366 (January 1–16, 2009) to #396 (August 21–28, 2009) and republished in a two-volume collected edition. The series underwent a four months hiatus between issues #380 to 393, due to Hiromoto being hospitalized for an injury. During the hiatus a special chapter titled  was published on Comic Bunch #383 (May 22, 2009), drawn by Hiromoto while he was hospitalized, but was not included in the later collected edition.

The manga centers around Jagi before becoming the masked villain he turned out to be in Fist of the North Star, depicting him as a young child seeking the affection of his adoptive father Ryuken. One day, Ryuken suddenly brings two older boys (Raoh and Toki) to live with Jagi, who are being trained in Ryuken's martial art of Hokuto Shinken. Feeling left out and rejected, Jagi does everything possible to convince Ryuken to teach him the art as well. When Jagi finally becomes Ryuken's newest disciple, he learns that Kenshiro, a younger boy, has already become Ryuken's disciple before him.

The second volume of the tankōbon collection contains a one-shot titled , which was previously published in the Sōten no Ken tribute issue of Weekly Comic Bunch (published on January 8, 2007).

Hōkō no Kumo
 by Missile Kakurai was published in Weekly Comic Bunch from issues #414 (January 2, 2010) to #445 (September 10, 2010). It was republished as a two-volume collected edition.

It centers around Juza of the Clouds as he wanders the wasteland without drive or purpose before he joined the Five Chariots and became sworn guardian to the Last General of Nanto.

Kin'yoku no Garuda
 by Yoshiji Yamaguchi was published on Comic Zenon from issues #29 (April 2013) to 34 (September 2013).

Unlike the earlier side-story spinoffs that were published in Comic Bunch, which focused on established characters, Kin'yoku no Garuda stars a new character who was designed by Tetsuo Hara himself for the pachislot game . The titular character, Garuda, is the successor of the  style, who initially seeks to usurp the Last General of Nanto.

Taisen Amiba no Isekai Haо̄ Densetsu - Isekai ni Itte mo Ore wa Tensai da!! N? Machigatta ka na...
An isekai spin-off series centered around the character Amiba began serialization in Comic Zenon on October 25, 2021.

List of volumes
Jibo no Hoshi: 
Sōkoku no Garō
 Volume 1: 
 Volume 2: 
 Volume 3: 
 Volume 4: 
 Volume 5: 
 Volume 6: 
Shirogane no Seija
 Volume 1: 
 Volume 2: 
 Volume 3: 
 Volume 4: 
 Volume 5: 
 Volume 6: 
Gokuaku no Hana
Volume 1: 
Volume 2: 
Hōkō no Kumo
 Volume 1: 
 Volume 2: 
Kinyoku no Garuda:

Notes

References

External links
Hokuto Gaiden  at the official Hokuto no Ken website 
Kinyoku no Garuda  official website at Comic Zenon 

Fist of the North Star
Seinen manga
Shinchosha manga
Shogakukan manga
Tokuma Shoten manga